Trevor Hamilton (born 19 June 1982), is a Northern Irish murderer.

He abducted and murdered 65-year-old Attracta Harron, a recently retired librarian, when she was returning from Mass in Murlog, Lifford, County Donegal on 11 December 2003. Four months earlier he had been released from prison after serving a sentence for a violent rape and other offences, including threats to kill.

Attracta Harron's body was found on 5 April 2004, four months after she was last seen alive, hidden in a river bank less than 50 yards from Hamilton's home.

Hamilton was found guilty of her murder on 12 April 2006. The trial judge, when sentencing him on 4 August 2006, recommended that he should never be released from prison (the first time this had happened in Northern Ireland, though such sentences have been imposed on as many as 50 inmates in England and Wales) but on 27 June 2008 the Court of Appeal instead ruled that he would have to serve 35 years before parole could be considered, meaning that he is now expected to remain in prison until at least 2040 and the age of 58.

References

External links
Review of how he was supervised by the statutory agencies
Northern Ireland Office statement
Statement by Northern Ireland Prison Service
Northern Ireland Courts Service press release on sentencing (DOC file)
Northern Ireland Courts Service Judge McLaughlin's Sentencing Statement - Full Version
Neutral Citation No.[2008 NICA  27 - Court of Appeal - The Queen v Trevor Hamilton
Family site

1982 births
Living people
Prisoners sentenced to life imprisonment by Northern Ireland
People convicted of murder by Northern Ireland
People from Northern Ireland convicted of murder
Prisoners from Northern Ireland sentenced to life imprisonment